Romance of the Underworld is a 1928 American silent drama film produced and distributed by Fox Film Corporation. Directed by Irving Cummings and starring Mary Astor, it was based upon a stage play called A Romance of the Underworld by Paul Armstrong. A previous version of the story was filmed as A Romance of the Underworld in 1918 by director James Kirkwood with Catherine Calvert in Astor's part.

Cast
Mary Astor as Judith Andrews
Ben Bard as Derby Dan Manning
Robert Elliott as Edwin Burke
John Boles as Stephen Ransome
Oscar Apfel as Champagne Joe
Helen Lynch as Blonodie Nell
William H. Tooker as Asa Jenks

Uncredited roles:

 William Benge as Bartender
 Maurice Black as Maitre D'  
 Sherry Hall as Pianist
 John Kelly as window cleaner

Censorship considerations
The Motion Picture Producers and Distributors of America, formed by the film industry in 1922, regulated the content of films through a list of subjects that were to be avoided. While Mary Astor portrayed a prostitute in Romance of the Underworld, this was acceptable as prostitution was not explicitly barred so long as it was not forced (i.e., white slavery) and aspects of her work was not shown in the film. Here the work of Astor's character is ambiguously described as being a "hostess."

Preservation
Romance of the Underworld is extant at the Museum of Modern Art. And also in a European archive.

References

External links

Lobby poster

1928 films
Fox Film films
American romantic drama films
American silent feature films
American films based on plays
Films directed by Irving Cummings
American gangster films
American black-and-white films
1928 romantic drama films
1920s American films
Silent romantic drama films
Silent American drama films